The lake Sultartangarlón is situated in the Highlands of Iceland to the north of the volcano Hekla. It is a reservoir of the river Þjórsá. Its surface area is 20 km2.
 
Many reservoirs have been constructed and are being constructed in the highlands, which raises questions in Icelandic society about the roles and interests of industry and environment.

See also
List of lakes of Iceland
Geography of Iceland

Lakes of Iceland